"Good Ole Days" is a song co-written and recorded by American country music artist Phil Vassar.  It was released in June 2005 as the third single from the album Shaken Not Stirred.  The song reached #22 on the Billboard Hot Country Songs chart.  The song was written by Vassar and Craig Wiseman.

Chart performance

References

2005 singles
2004 songs
Phil Vassar songs
Songs written by Phil Vassar
Songs written by Craig Wiseman
Song recordings produced by Frank Rogers (record producer)
Arista Nashville singles